Two ships of the Royal Navy have been named HMS Windflower:

  was an  launched in 1918 and sold for scrap in 1927
  was a  launched in 1940 and loaned to Canada as HMCS Windflower in May 1941, she was sunk in December of the same year

Royal Navy ship names